Processed cheese (also known as process cheese, cheese food, prepared cheese, cheese product, or plastic cheese) is a food product made from cheese and unfermented dairy ingredients mixed with emulsifiers. Additional ingredients, such as vegetable oils, salt, food coloring, or sugar may be included. As a result, many flavors, colors, and textures of processed cheese exist. Processed cheese typically contains around 50 to 60% traditional cheese.

History
Processed cheese was first developed in Switzerland in 1911, when Walter Gerber and Fritz Stettler, seeking a cheese with longer shelf life and influenced by cheese sauces such as those used in fondue, added sodium citrate to melted Emmentaler cheese and found that the emulsified cheese sauce could be re-cooled into a solid again. Shortly after, in 1916, Canadian-American businessman James L. Kraft applied for the first U.S. patent covering a new method of processing cheese, which halted the maturation process.

Advantages 

Processed cheese has several technical advantages over natural cheese, including a far longer shelf life, resistance to separating when cooked (meltability), and a uniform look and physical behavior. Its mass-produced nature also provides a dramatically lower cost—to producers and consumers alike—than conventional cheesemaking. This, in turn, enables industrial-scale production volumes, lower distribution costs, a steadier supply, and much faster production time compared to traditional cheeses.

The use of emulsifiers in processed cheese results in a product that melts without separating when cooked; with prolonged heating, some traditional cheeses (especially cheddar and mozzarella) separate into a lumpy, molten protein gel and liquid fat combination. The emulsifiers (typically sodium phosphate, potassium phosphate, tartrate, or citrate) reduce the tendency for tiny fat globules in the cheese to coalesce and pool on the surface.

Because processed cheese does not separate when melted, it is used as an ingredient in a variety of dishes. Unlike some unprocessed cheeses, heating does not alter its taste or texture.

Sale and labeling 
Processed cheese is often sold in blocks, pressurized cans, and packs of individual slices, often separated by wax paper, or with each slice individually wrapped by machine.

United Kingdom 
In the United Kingdom, processed cheese is typically sold in individually wrapped slices, often referred to as "singles", or in foil-wrapped portions. Dairylea and The Laughing Cow are leading brands.

United States 

In 1916, Canadian James L. Kraft applied for the first U.S. patent for a method of making processed cheese. Kraft Foods Inc. developed the first commercially available, shelf-stable, sliced processed cheese; it was introduced in 1950. The first commercially available individually wrapped cheese slices were introduced in the U.S. by Clearfield Cheese Co. in 1956. These forms of processed cheese have become ubiquitous in U.S. households ever since, most notably used for cheeseburgers and grilled cheese sandwiches because of its ability to cook evenly, distribute/stretch smoothly, and resist congealing, unlike traditional cheddar cheeses. Competitors lobbied unsuccessfully to require processed cheese be labeled "embalmed cheese".

The best known processed cheese in the United States is marketed as American cheese by Kraft Foods, Borden, and other companies. It is yellow or off-white, mild, has a medium consistency and melts easily. It is typically made from a blend of cheeses, most often Colby and cheddar. Another type of processed cheese created in the United States is Provel pizza cheese, which uses cheddar, Swiss, and provolone cheeses as flavorants. Provel cheese is commonly used in St. Louis-style pizza.

Legal definitions 
Owing to its highly mechanized (i.e., assembly line) methods of production, and additive ingredients (e.g., oils, salts, or colors), some softer varieties of processed cheese cannot legally be labeled as actual "cheese" in many countries, even those in which slightly harder varieties can be. Such products tend to be classified as "cheese food", "cheese spread", or "cheese product" (depending primarily on the amount of cheese, moisture, and milkfat present in the final product).

United States 

In the United States, processed cheese is defined, categorized, and regulated by the Food and Drug Administration (FDA) under the U.S. Code of Federal Regulations Title 21, Section 133 ("Cheeses and Cheese-Related Products"). Pasteurized process cheese can be made from a single cheese, or a blend of several cheeses. Cream, milk fat, water, salt, color, and spices may also be added. The mixture is heated with an emulsifier, poured into a mold, and allowed to cool. The definitions include:
 Pasteurized process cheese, which is made from one or more cheeses (excluding certain cheeses such as cream cheese and cottage cheese, but including American cheese). In the final product, moisture must not be more than 41 percent of the weight, and fat content not less than 49 percent.
 Pasteurized process cheese food, which is made from one or more of the cheeses available for pasteurized process cheese composing not less than 51 percent of the final weight, mixed with one or more optional dairy ingredients such as fluid milk or whey, and which may contain one or more specified optional non-dairy ingredients. The final solid form must be less than 44 percent moisture and have a fat content greater than 23 percent.
Moisture must be between 44 and 60 percent of the total weight, and fat content greater than 20 percent.

The FDA does not maintain a standard of identity for either "pasteurized prepared cheese product", a designation which particularly appears on many Kraft products, or "pasteurized process cheese product", a designation which appears particularly on many American store- and generic-branded singles. Products labeled as such may use milk protein concentrate (MPC) in the formulation, which is not listed in the permitted optional dairy ingredients. The desire to use inexpensive imported milk protein concentrate is noted as motivation for the introduction of these and similar terms, and for the relabeling of some products. After an FDA Warning Letter protesting Kraft's use of MPC in late 2002, some varieties of Kraft Singles formerly labeled "pasteurized process cheese food" became "pasteurized prepared cheese product", Velveeta was relabeled from "pasteurized process cheese spread" to "pasteurized prepared cheese product", and Easy Cheese from "pasteurized process cheese spread" to "pasteurized cheese snack".

See also
 Cheese sauce

Notes

References

External links 

 American Chemical Society article on processed cheese
 "From Cheese to Cheese Food: How Kraft persuaded Americans to accept cheese by divorcing it from its microbe-laden origins", American Heritage, January 2001

 
American cheeses
Culinary Heritage of Switzerland
Products introduced in 1911